Anson D. Shupe, Jr. (21 January 1948 – 4 May 2015) was an American sociologist noted for his studies of religious groups and their countermovements, family violence and clergy misconduct. He was affiliated with the New Cult Awareness Network, an organisation operated by the Church of Scientology, and had at least one article published in Freedom magazine.

Work
Shupe was a professor of sociology at the Indiana University-Purdue University Fort Wayne campus at Fort Wayne, Indiana. He completed his doctorate in political sociology at Indiana University in 1975 and held office in various professional associations, including the Society for the Scientific Study of Religion and the Association for the Sociology of Religion, and the Association for the Scientific Study of Religion.  Shupe often collaborated with other scholars, notably David G. Bromley and Jeffrey K. Hadden.

An advocate for religious freedom, Shupe conducted fieldwork on the Unification Church and other new religious movements, as well as their opponents.  Together with David G. Bromley, Shupe was considered one of the foremost social science authorities on the anti-cult movement, based on a series of books and articles on the topic he coauthored with Bromley.

Other areas Shupe researched included the New Christian Right, religious broadcasting, and the political impact of fundamentalism; he also wrote about family violence and clergy misconduct, i.e. violent or exploitative behaviour on the part of pastors, ministers or gurus. He frequently acted as a consultant to attorneys in lawsuits involving issues of religious freedom or clergy abuse.

Publications

 "Moonies" in America: Cult. Church. and Crusade. Beverly Hills, CA: SAGE Publications, 1979. (with David G. Bromley). Introduction by John Lofland. 269 pp.
 The New Vigilantes: Deprogrammers, Anti-Cultists, and the New Religions. Beverly Hills, SAGE Publications, 1980. 267 pp.
 Six Perspectives on New Religions: A Case Study Approach. Lewiston and Queenston: Edwin Mellen Press, 1981. 235 pp. 
 Strange Gods: The Great American Cult Scare. Boston: Beacon, 1981. (with David G. Bromley) 249 pp. 
 The Anti-Cult Movement in America: A Bibliography and Historical Survey. New York: Garland Press, 1984. (with David G. Bromley and Donna L. Oliver) i-xiii + 169 pp.
 A Documentary History of the Anti-Cult Movement. Arlington, TX, University of Texas Center for Social Research Press, 1986. (with David G. Bromley) 376 pp.
 The Mormon Corporate Empire. Boston: Beacon, 1986. (with John Heinerman) 
 Televangelism, Power and Politics on God's Frontier, Anson Shupe and Jeffrey Hadden, Henry Holt & Co (April 1, 1988), 325pp. 
 The Darker Side of Virtue: Corruption, Scandal, and the Mormon Empire, Prometheus Books (May 1, 1991), 168pp. 
 Religion and Politics in Comparative Perspective: Revival of Religious Fundamentalism in East and West, Bronislaw Misztal & Anson Shupe (Eds.), Praeger Publishers (November 30, 1992), 240pp. 
 Anti-Cult Movements in Cross-Cultural Perspective. New York and London: Garland Publishing, 1994. (edited with David G. Bromley). 
 The Violent Couple. Westport, CT: Praeger Publishers (1994) (with William A. Stacey and Lonnie H. Hazlewood). 182 pp.
 "Religion, Mobilization, and Social Action". Bronislaw Misztal & Anson Shupe (Eds.), Praeger Publishers (1998), 260pp. 
 Bad Pastors: Clergy Misconduct in Modern America New York: New York University Press, 2000, Edited by Anson Shupe, William A. Stacey, Susan E. Darnell; 
 "The Cult Awareness Network and the Anticult Movement: Implications for NRMs in America" (with Susan E. Darnell and Kendrick Moxon) in New Religious Movements and Religious Liberty in America. edited by Derek H. Davis and Barry Hankins. Waco: J.M.Dawson Institute of Church-State Studies and Baylor University Press, 2002. 
 "The North American Anti-cult Movement: Vicissitudes of Success and Failure." in The Oxford Handbook of New Religious Movements (with David G. Bromley and Susan E. Darnell), ed. by James R. Lewis. NY: Oxford University Press, 2004, pp. 184–205.
 "Anticult Movements" entry in Lindsay Jones, editor-in-chief, Encyclopedia of Religion. 2nd edition. Vol. 1 Thomson/Macmillan 2005, pp. 395–7.
 "Deprogramming" entry in Lindsay Jones, editor-in-chief, Encyclopedia of Religion. 2nd edition Vol. 4 Thomson/Macmillan 2005, pp. 2291–3.
 Agents of Discord: The Cult Awareness Network, Deprogramming and Bad Science. New Brunswick: Transaction, 2006. (with Susan E. Darnell) 
 Spoils of the Kingdom - Clergy Misconduct and Religious Community.  University of Illinois Press, 2007. , .

Assessment

 Jackson W. Carroll, Review of In The Name of All That's Holy, Review of Religious Research 38 (1996): 90-91.
 Hans A. Baer, Review of The Darker Side of Virtue, Journal for the Scientific Study of Religion, 31 (1992): 242-243.
 A.J. Pavlos, Review of Six Perspectives on New Religions, Journal for the Scientific Study of Religion, 22 (1983): 95-96.
 Stephen A. Kent and Theresa Krebs, "When Scholars Know Sin: Alternative Religions and Their Academic Supporters," Skeptic, 6/3 (1988): 36-44. Also see J. Gordon Melton, Anson D. Shupe and James R. Lewis, "When Scholars Know Sin" Forum Reply to Kent and Krebs, Skeptic, 7/1 (1999): 14-21.
 Did Scientology Strike Back?, The American Lawyer, June 1997

References

External links
 Curriculum Vitae
 Anson Shupe's entry in the Encyclopedia of Religion and Society
 The Reconstructionist Movement on the New Christian Right by Anson Shupe

1948 births
2015 deaths
American sociologists
Sociologists of religion
Researchers of new religious movements and cults
Critics of the Unification Church
Critics of Mormonism
Place of birth missing
Indiana University – Purdue University Fort Wayne alumni